546 may refer to:

the year 546 AD

Any of the following American roads:
KY 546, a former state highway in Kentucky
LA 546, a state highway in Louisiana
Route 546, a state highway in Maryland
CR546, a county route in the state of New Jersey
Erie County Route 546, a county route in the state of New York
Route 546, a state highway in Ohio
Route 546, a state highway in Pennsylvania
Route 546, a state highway in Washington

Or, Secondary Highway 546 in the Algoma District of Ontario, Canada.